Troy Dixon (born 22 December 1969) is an Australian cricketer. He played in eleven first-class matches for Queensland between 1993 and 2000.

See also
 List of Queensland first-class cricketers

References

External links
 

1969 births
Living people
Australian cricketers
Queensland cricketers
Cricketers from Geelong